Bir Sherestha Shaheed Shipahi Mostafa Kamal Stadium, (বীরশ্রেষ্ঠ শহিদ সিপাহি মোস্তফা কামাল ফুটবল স্টেডিয়াম) known as Kamalapur Stadium, is a football stadium in Kamalapur, Dhaka, Bangladesh. It is one of the main venues of the Bangladesh Championship League and Dhaka League.

See also
 List of football stadiums in Bangladesh
 Stadiums in Bangladesh

References

Football venues in Bangladesh